Batrachedra atriloqua is a moth in the family Batrachedridae. It is found on Fiji. The larvae have been recorded feeding on Cocos nucifera.

References

Natural History Museum Lepidoptera generic names catalog

Batrachedridae
Moths described in 1931